Wigan Robin Park FC was a semi-professional football club from Wigan, Greater Manchester, England.

The Robins had two senior sides, the first team competed in the North West Counties League Division One, and the reserve team competed in the Fourth Division of the Manchester Football League. The club played their home games at the Robin Park Arena on Loire Drive, adjacent to the DW Stadium.

The first team resigned from the league in June 2015.

History
Wigan Robin Park Football Club was founded in 2005 and joined the Manchester Football League – a feeder league of the North West Counties divisions. After winning the Manchester League in 2007–08 they were promoted to the North West Counties League Division One.

The 2011–12 season saw success for the club after they were crowned champions of Division One, winning promotion to the Premier Division.

In January 2014, Steve Halliwell announced that Darryl Picton would be replacing him as chairman.

After playing two seasons in the North West Counties Football League Premier Division, they were relegated to Division One at the end of the 2013–14 season.

Honours
North West Counties Football League Division One
Champions 2011–12
Manchester Football League Premier Division
Champions 2007–08
Gilgryst Cup
Winners 2007–08
Lancashire Shield
Runners-up 2007–08
Manchester Football League Division One
Runners-up 2006–07
Murray Shield
Runners-up 2005–06

Records
FA Cup
Extra Preliminary Round replay 2010–11
FA Vase
Third Round 2012–13

References

Club history on official website

External links
Official website

Association football clubs established in 2005
Football clubs in the Metropolitan Borough of Wigan
2005 establishments in England
North West Counties Football League clubs
Defunct football clubs in England
Association football clubs disestablished in 2015
Sport in Wigan
Defunct football clubs in Greater Manchester
Manchester Football League